An augur is a public official in ancient Rome.

Augur may also refer to:

People
 Christopher C. Augur (1821–1898), American Civil War officer
 Helen Augur (died 1969), American journalist
 Hezekiah Augur (1791–1858), American sculptor and inventor
 Jean Augur (1934–1993), British teacher and dyslexia activist

Fiction
 Augur, the eighth month of the fictional Zork calendar
 Augur, a fictional weapon from the Resistance: Fall of Man video game

Other uses
 Augur (software), a decentralized prediction market built using Ethereum
 Augur buzzard, an African bird of prey
 Augur (caste), a sub-group of the Jogi caste in India
 Eugene Augur, a countercultural underground newspaper published 1969–1974
Tallinna JK Augur, football club in Estonia

See also
 Agar (disambiguation)
 Auger (disambiguation)